State Route 2 (SR 2) is a state highway in the U.S. state of California. It connects the Los Angeles Basin with the San Gabriel Mountains and the Victor Valley in the Mojave Desert. The highway's southwestern end is at the intersection of Centinela Avenue at the Santa Monica-Los Angeles border and its northeastern end is at SR 138 east of Wrightwood. The SR 2 is divided into four segments, and it briefly runs concurrently with U.S. Route 101 (US 101) and Interstate 210 (I-210). The southwestern section of SR 2 runs along a segment of the east–west Santa Monica Boulevard, an old routing of US 66, to US 101 in East Hollywood; the second section runs along segments of both the north–south Alvarado Street and Glendale Boulevard in Echo Park; the third section to I-210 in Glendale is known as the north–south Glendale Freeway; and the northeastern portion from I-210 in La Cañada Flintridge to SR 138 is designated as the Angeles Crest Highway.

Route description

SR 2 is known as the Angeles Crest Scenic Byway, a National Forest Scenic Byway, from SR 2's east junction with I-210 in La Cañada Flintridge to the Los Angeles–San Bernardino county line. The Big Pines Highway is routed along SR 2 from County Route N4 (CR N4, the northwest continuation of the designation) in Big Pines to the Los Angeles–San Bernardino county line.

SR 2 is part of the California Freeway and Expressway System, and except for much of the mountain portion is part of the National Highway System, a network of highways that are considered essential to the country's economy, defense, and mobility by the Federal Highway Administration. SR 2 is eligible to be included in the State Scenic Highway System; however, only the portion of SR 2 from a point northeast of the I-210 interchange to the San Bernardino County line is actually designated as a scenic highway by the California Department of Transportation (Caltrans), meaning that it is a substantial section of highway passing through a "memorable landscape" with no "visual intrusions", where the potential designation has gained popular favor with the community.

The California Legislature has relinquished state control of various segments of SR 2 in Santa Monica, Los Angeles, Beverly Hills and West Hollywood, and turned them over to local control.

SR 1 to the southeast junction with US 101

The original official southwestern terminus of SR 2 was at the junction of Lincoln Boulevard, SR 1, and I-10 in Santa Monica. SR 2 then proceeded northwest on Lincoln Boulevard before turning northeast on Santa Monica Boulevard. Since the California Legislature relinquished segments of the highway, state control of SR 2 now officially begins at the point where Santa Monica Boulevard crosses the Santa Monica–Los Angeles city limits at Centinela Avenue. From Centinela Avenue, SR 2 heads northeast on Santa Monica Boulevard, where it heads northeast through West Los Angeles, Westwood, Century City, and Beverly Hills before entering West Hollywood. Santa Monica Boulevard, as a major street, is for most of its length at least four lanes wide.

At its west end, Santa Monica Boulevard starts off Ocean Avenue in Santa Monica. From there until Sepulveda Boulevard, Santa Monica Boulevard is a densely urban commercial street. Most of the Westside car dealerships are located on Santa Monica Boulevard. After Sepulveda, Santa Monica Boulevard passes Century City, and intersects Wilshire Boulevard in Beverly Hills.

The south roadway of Santa Monica Boulevard, often called Little Santa Monica Boulevard in Beverly Hills, runs parallel to the state highway (north) roadway of Santa Monica Boulevard from the city's west limit to Rexford Drive. After Rexford Drive, Little Santa Monica turns east, becoming Burton Way. Burton Way merges into San Vicente Boulevard at its intersection with La Cienega Boulevard. It is noted that the south roadway of Santa Monica Boulevard in Beverly Hills is a city street while the north roadway of Santa Monica Boulevard is a California state highway, each roadway handling bi-directional traffic.

After intersecting Wilshire, Santa Monica Boulevard continues northeast toward West Hollywood, spanning Beverly Boulevard and Melrose Avenue. At Holloway Drive, in the middle of West Hollywood, Santa Monica, now north of Melrose Avenue turns to the east. In West Hollywood, between Fairfax Avenue and Doheny Drive along Santa Monica Boulevard, bronze name plaques are embedded in the sidewalks as part of the West Hollywood Memorial Walk. SR 2 continues east through Hollywood on Santa Monica Boulevard to the Hollywood Freeway.

Route 2 then merges onto U.S. Route 101 (the Hollywood Freeway) and heads southeast leaving US 101 at the Alvarado Street exit.

Southeast junction with US 101 to I-210

Alvarado Street and Glendale Boulevard

From US 101, Route 2 heads northeast on Alvarado Street through the community of Echo Park. The route then turns north onto Glendale Boulevard.

Glendale Freeway

After crossing Allesandro Street, Route 2 then branches northeast onto the Glendale Freeway, a north–south route. With five lanes each direction, the freeway is quite wide. It intersects the 5 Freeway (the Golden State Freeway) and then crosses the Los Angeles River, and runs through the communities of Glassell Park and Eagle Rock.

After its interchange with the eastern Ventura Freeway (SR 134), the Glendale Freeway route follows a ridge in the San Rafael Hills through eastern Glendale. The freeway ends in the Crescenta Valley, at Foothill Boulevard in La Cañada Flintridge. Just before reaching Foothill Boulevard, SR 2 turns off the Glendale Freeway onto the eastbound Foothill Freeway (Interstate 210) for a short distance until reaching the Angeles Crest Highway exit in La Cañada Flintridge.

The Glendale Freeway was originally proposed to continue through Echo Park all the way to Hollywood Freeway (101). Since that plan has been scrapped, the freeway is somewhat isolated from the remainder of the LA freeway system.

I-210 to Route 138

The eastern portions of the Angeles Crest Highway are notoriously dangerous, with many switchbacks and blind curves, and are often closed during occasions of heavy winter snowfall. The highway is generally closed between Islip Saddle and Vincent Gap from mid-December to mid-May due to snow and rockfall.

History

Designation
In 1964, Route 2 was defined as a single route from Santa Monica to Wrightwood with no discontinuities. The segment of former US 66 on Santa Monica Boulevard west of the Hollywood Freeway and Lincoln Boulevard was added to Route 2 at this time, since US 66 was truncated to Pasadena. Route 2 became discontinuous at Routes 101 and 210 in 1965 and 1990, respectively.

Before the segment of the Glendale Freeway was built between Glendale Boulevard and just west of the Los Angeles River, Route 2 began at the Hollywood Freeway on Santa Monica Boulevard, continued east to Myra Avenue, then north on Myra Avenue, east on Fountain Avenue, northeast on Hyperion Avenue, southeast on Rowena Avenue, southeast on Glendale Boulevard, and northeast on Fletcher Drive to just west of the Los Angeles River. From west of the Los Angeles River, Route 2 continued on the Glendale Freeway to its temporary connection with Fletcher Drive at Avenue 38 and then followed the routing described in the previous paragraph to Route 138 northeast of Wrightwood.

Before the segment of the Glendale Freeway was built north of Glassell Park, Route 2 continued north on Fletcher Drive to Eagle Rock Boulevard, then north on Eagle Rock Boulevard to Verdugo Road, north on Verdugo to Cañada, north on Cañada back to Verdugo, and north and east on Verdugo to the Angeles Crest Highway (then Haskell Street).

Beverly Hills Freeway
Originally, it was to have been the Beverly Hills Freeway from Route 405 to Route 101 just east of Vermont Avenue, flowing onto the Glendale Freeway. In fact, the proposed freeway on Route 2 west of Route 101 was the original routing of the "Santa Monica Freeway" (a name which subsequently went to the distantly parallel Route 10). However, for a variety of political reasons, the department never reached agreement with Beverly Hills to build the segment through that city. At one time, the department considered building a cut-and-cover tunnel under Beverly Hills, but even this proved a non-starter, and the freeway plan west of Route 101 was quietly cancelled in 1975. Currently, the Glendale Freeway begins as a stub at Glendale Boulevard. A freeway-wide bridge was built over Glendale Boulevard in hopes that the freeway would be built further west. Today, the bridge serves as the westbound lanes of Route 2, connecting the southwestbound freeway lanes to southbound Glendale Boulevard. A more modest freeway/expressway extension to Route 101 has been discussed.

Planners originally intended for it to connect to the Hollywood Freeway with Route 101 near the Vermont Avenue interchange, but community opposition killed the project by the 1960s (which is why there is a huge median around the cancelled interchange today). The Glendale Freeway offers stunning vistas of the eastern San Fernando Valley, the Verdugo Mountains, the Crescenta Valley, and the San Gabriel Mountains.

In the 1960s, the city of Beverly Hills had begun a transition from a quasi-exurban retreat for the entertainment industry to its current status as one of the world's premier shopping and culinary destinations. Building a freeway along Santa Monica Boulevard, the northwestern border of the city's emergent "Golden Triangle" shopping district, did not fit into city fathers' vision for Beverly Hills' development. Moreover, it was feared that a freeway would exacerbate the already evident divisions between the fabulously wealthy residents of the hilly areas north of Santa Monica Boulevard and the merely affluent ones to the south. A proposed cut-and-cover tunnel for the freeway failed to generate sufficient political support, and by the mid-1970s the project was essentially dead.

California State Senator (later Congressman) Anthony Beilenson was one of the leading opponents of the project.

Caltrans' decision not to build the freeway was both harmful and beneficial to the areas along its proposed route. The massive Century City high-rise commercial development just west of the Beverly Hills city limits was built with freeway access in mind. For many Century City workers who live in Los Angeles' eastern suburbs, the quickest way home takes them through the residential district of Cheviot Hills, which has caused consternation among its well-heeled residents. For Beverly Hills, the decision helped preserve much of its emergent downtown, but at the cost of creating gridlock on Wilshire Boulevard and I-10.

Further construction
The first segment of freeway was built in the 1950s and ran from just west of the Los Angeles River to Avenue 38 in Glassell Park. This portion was at one time named the Allesandro Freeway, because it runs next to Allesandro Street. The last segment of freeway, from Route 134 to Route 210, was built between 1972 and 1975.

Starting in July 1964, Route 2 began in Santa Monica at its junction with Routes 1 and 10. After heading a few blocks northwest on Lincoln Boulevard, the route turned northeast on Santa Monica Boulevard, just several blocks from the Pacific Ocean. The route continued on Santa Monica Boulevard to Centinela Avenue.

For its entire length, until the tracks were removed, Santa Monica Boulevard followed the tracks of the Pacific Electric Railway. In the portion from Holloway Drive in West Hollywood to Sepulveda Boulevard in West Los Angeles, the tracks were in a separate right-of-way, with two roadways, one on each side of the tracks. For the rest of the route, the tracks ran in the traffic lanes.

Except for a short portion at its eastern end, Santa Monica Boulevard was adopted as a state highway in 1933. From 1934 to 1936, it was signed as State Route 2. Then it became U.S. Route 66. When U.S. Route 66 was truncated to Pasadena in 1964, Santa Monica Boulevard once again became State Route 2 as far east as the Hollywood Freeway. Today, the State Route 2 portion of Santa Monica Boulevard is defined from the Santa Monica/Los Angeles city limits to US 101.

From 1936 to 1964, U.S. Route 66 ran along Lincoln Boulevard from its junction with Alternate U. S. 101 (now California Route 1) and California Route 26 (now replaced by Interstate 10) to Santa Monica Boulevard and along Santa Monica Boulevard from Lincoln Boulevard to the Hollywood Freeway. US 66 turned southeast on the Hollywood Freeway with US 101. At that time, Route 2 began on Alvarado Street at the Hollywood Freeway. As is today, Route 2 traversed Alvarado Street and Glendale Boulevard to the Glendale Freeway. Route 2 continued on the Glendale Freeway to a temporary connection with Fletcher Drive at Avenue 38 in the Atwater district of Los Angeles. From the temporary connection, the route ran northeast on Fletcher Drive, and north on Verdugo Road to its south intersection with Cañada Boulevard in Glendale. From the south intersection, Route 2 headed north on Cañada Boulevard to its north intersection with Verdugo Road, north on Verdugo Road, and east on Verdugo Boulevard, before reaching Foothill Boulevard in La Canada Flintridge. Route 2 continued approximately one mile southeast on Foothill Boulevard with California Route 118 to Angeles Crest Highway. From Foothill Boulevard, Route 2 continued north on Angeles Crest Highway, where it continues to this day.

Today, the California Transportation Commission is relinquishing the street-running parts of Route 2 to local cities which it runs through. In 1996, state law was changed to permit the relinquishment of Route 2 in Santa Monica and West Hollywood. When the relinquishment in Santa Monica went through in 1998, the portion from Route 1 to Centinela Avenue was deleted. The law was changed again in 2001 to allow Route 2 from Route 405 to Moreno Drive to be relinquished to the City of Los Angeles. In 2003 California Senate Bill 315 was chaptered, acknowledging the relinquishments within Santa Monica, West Hollywood, and from Route 405 to Moreno Drive in Los Angeles, and permitting the relinquishment of Route 2 in Beverly Hills. Whether Route 2 west of Route 101 will stay as a paper route after relinquishment is yet to be determined.

Since the 1950s, proposals have been made to extend the Glendale Freeway to the Antelope Valley Freeway via a tunnel under the San Gabriels, relieving some of the latter freeway's notorious congestion. The difficulty of designing and building such a route through the mountains (designated SR 249) and the cost of insuring it against earthquakes and terrorism would undoubtedly make perpetually cash-strapped Caltrans unable to undertake such an ambitious project.

In popular culture

The section of freeway between the Ventura Freeway (134) and the Foothill Freeway (210) was largely completed in late 1972, but not fully finished until late spring 1978. During this five year period, the section from just north of the 134 Ventura freeway to approximately Mountain St (Glendale College) was not built. During this time, the closed freeway and an on/off ramp at Verdugo Blvd in Montrose were used as a location for several films due to its relatively complete construction status, and its proximity to major movie studios in Southern California. Some of these productions included Coffy, Corvette Summer, The Gumball Rally, Death Race 2000, Cannonball, Hardcore, and several American television series including Adam-12, Emergency! and CHiPs. The transition overpass from the eastbound Ventura Freeway to the northbound Glendale Freeway was prominently featured in the notorious disaster film Earthquake when a livestock truck and two cars crash over the side of the overpass (a shot completed in miniature special effects). Ever since it was opened in 1978, this section of freeway is still relatively lightly traveled (especially on weekends), and is still utilized as a filming location, with filming typically done early on weekend mornings.

Major intersections

See also

References

External links

 California @ AARoads.com – State Route 2
 Caltrans: Route 2 highway conditions
 California Highways: Route 2

Angeles National Forest
State Route 002
State Route 002
San Gabriel Mountains
002
002
002
Transportation in the San Fernando Valley
U.S. Route 66 in California